Knud Herbert Sørensen (born 21 January 1934) is a former footballer and Danish international.

Biography 

Knud Herbert Sørensen played his entire career as defender in Vejle Boldklub.

Herbert Sørensen was an intelligent defender with a good ability to foresee the moves of the opponent strikers.  Also, he was known as the funny guy of the dressing room.

In 1956 Herbert Sørensen was a central player in the team that secured Vejle Boldklub promotion to the best Danish league. In 1958 he won The Double with VB - Herbert Sørensen was voted Man of the Match in the Danish Cup final against Copenhagen.  The great triumph was followed up the next season when Vejle won the title once again.

Herbert Sørensen made his debut for the Denmark national football team in 1958. He played two games for the national team in 1958.

References 

 Danish national team profile
 Vejle Boldklub profile

1934 births
Living people
Danish men's footballers
Denmark under-21 international footballers
Denmark international footballers
Vejle Boldklub players
People from Middelfart Municipality
Association football defenders
Middelfart Boldklub players
Sportspeople from the Region of Southern Denmark